Kingston Heath Soccer Complex, is an Australian soccer stadium in Melbourne, Australia. It is the home of the Bentleigh Greens. The stadium has a capacity of 3,300.

History
The venue underwent a $3 million redevelopment in 2010 which included pavilion upgrades, new changing rooms, as well as new synthetic pitches. This redevelopment opened in late July 2010.

References

External links
Bentleigh Greens
Soccerway page

Soccer venues in Melbourne
Sports venues in Melbourne
Bentleigh Greens SC
A-League Women stadiums
Cheltenham, Victoria
Sport in the City of Kingston (Victoria)
Buildings and structures in the City of Kingston (Victoria)